This is a list of published trails in Australia, suitable for walking in three days or longer.

Trails

See also
Trail
Long-distance trail
List of long-distance trails
Walking
Hiking
Backpacking
List of people who have walked across Australia

References

Notes
http://www.john.chapman.name/longwlk2.html
https://web.archive.org/web/20091024095218/http://www.derm.qld.gov.au/parks_and_forests/great_walks/index.html

External links
Aushiker.com - Comprehensive Resource on bushwalking in Western Australia
Resource on the most famous Oceania treks
hike-australia.com - a site focused on hiking in Victoria with hike gear reviews and suggested trails
compareandchoose.com.au - backpacking advice and backpacking safety Australia
https://www.kangarooislandwildernesstrail.sa.gov.au/home
https://www.walkingsa.org.au/walk/find-a-place-to-walk/kangaroo-island-wilderness-trail/

Australia, long-distance
Pedestrian infrastructure in Australia
Hiking tracks